DeWanna Bonner (born August 21, 1987) is an American-Macedonian professional basketball player for the Connecticut Sun of the Women's National Basketball Association (WNBA). Bonner played college basketball for Auburn University. After a successful college career at Auburn, she was drafted by the Phoenix Mercury with the fifth overall pick of the 2009 WNBA draft, and was traded to the Sun 11 years later.

Personal life
Born on August 21, 1987, to LaShelle Bonner and Greg McCall. She has three siblings, sister Vin'Centia Dewberry, brother Justin McCall, and sister Erica McCall (whom she shares a birthday with). Bonner majored in Psychology at Auburn University.

In November 2014 Bonner married fellow WNBA player (and former Mercury teammate) Candice Dupree. In April 2017, it was confirmed Bonner was expecting the couple's first child and will miss the 2017 WNBA season.  Bonner and Dupree gave birth to twin daughters in July 2017.

In March 2018, Bonner has received Macedonian passport and is eligible to play for Macedonian basketball team.

On February 16, 2021, she posted on her Instagram account that she had begun a romantic relationship with her Connecticut Sun teammate, Alyssa Thomas. In the post, possibly referencing her relationship with Dupree, she wrote, "I know some may have a lot of questions, but I didn't post this picture for that."

High school
Bonner attended high school at Fairfield High School in Fairfield, Alabama. She was named McDonald's and WBCA All-American and participated in their All-America games. She earned USA Today Junior All-America and was the Gatorade Alabama Player of the Year while at Fairfield High School. She was featured in USA Today as one of the top 25 recruits in the nation during summer of 2005.

College career
Bonner went to Auburn University, where she earned a degree in psychology. She was named to the SEC All-Freshman Team. She scored in double figures in 22 games during the 2005–06 season and led the Tigers with a 13.5 points per game average, the first time since 1980–81 that a freshman led the team in scoring.

This led Bonner to join the youth teams of US basketball, winning the 2006 FIBA Americas Under-20 Championship for Women and the FIBA Under-21 World Championship for Women one year later.

Bonner went on to put together one of the most impressive careers ever at Auburn. The 2009 SEC Player of the Year and a National Player of the Year finalist, she broke the Auburn career scoring record during the Ole Miss game at the SEC Tournament. She finished her career with 2,162 points, nearly 100 more than the former school record.

She also finished her career as one of Auburn's top rebounders, taking second all-time with 1,047 rebounds, placing her among three Tigers to ever finish their career with more than 2,000 points and 1,000 rebounds. Listed in the top 10 in every major statistical category at Auburn, she also ranks sixth in blocks, seventh in steals, first in free throws, fourth in field goals and 10th in 3-pointers.

Bonner led the SEC in scoring that season, becoming the first Auburn player to ever earn the honor. She also ranked 10th in the country in scoring while setting the Auburn single-season scoring record with 716 points, 21.1 per game. 
 
She went on to earn WBCA/State Farm, USBWA, AP and ESPN.com All-America honors and was voted the Alabama Sports Writers Association Amateur Athlete of the Year.

Auburn statistics
Source

WNBA career
Bonner was selected 5th overall in the 2009 WNBA Draft by the Phoenix Mercury. In her first regular season game with the Mercury, Bonner played 26 minutes and scored 16 points. October 9, 2009, as a rookie, Bonner scored 13 points to contribute toward the 2009 championship.

On September 12, 2014, Bonner won her second WNBA Championship, with 12 points, 9 rebounds and 3 assists.

In 2017 Bonner sat out the whole season due to pregnancy. She would return to the team in 2018 and be voted into the 2018 WNBA All-Star Game. Later on in the season, the Mercury made the playoffs as the fifth seed and were one game away from reaching the finals as they lost in five games to the Seattle Storm in the semi-finals.

On February 11, 2020, Bonner was traded to the Connecticut Sun for three first round draft picks.

WNBA career statistics

Regular season

|-
| style="text-align:left;background:#afe6ba;"| 2009†
| style="text-align:left;"| Phoenix
| 34 || 0 || 21.3 || .457 || .154 || .812 || 5.8 || 0.4 || 0.6 || 0.7 || 1.0 || 11.2
|-
| style="text-align:left;"| 2010
| style="text-align:left;"| Phoenix
| 32 || 4 || 25.4 || .465 || .358 || .840 || 6.1 || 1.3 || 0.6 || 1.2 || 1.2 || 12.0
|-
| style="text-align:left;"| 2011
| style="text-align:left;"| Phoenix
| 34 || 5 || 25.2 || .430 || .343 || .909 || 7.0 || 0.8 || 1.0 || 1.0 || 1.0 || 10.7
|-
| style="text-align:left;"| 2012
| style="text-align:left;"| Phoenix
| 32 || 32 || 35.0 || .364 || .283 || .852 || 7.2 || 2.2 || 1.7 || 0.8 || 2.3 || 20.6
|-
| style="text-align:left;"| 2013
| style="text-align:left;"| Phoenix
| 34 || 33 || 32.9 || .410 || .325 || .901 || 5.8 || 2.4 || 1.1 || 0.3 || 1.6 || 14.5
|-
| style="text-align:left;background:#afe6ba;"| 2014†
| style="text-align:left;"| Phoenix
| 34 || 34 || 29.2 || .459 || .279 || .780 || 4.1 || 2.3 || 1.4 || 0.4 || 1.3 || 10.4
|-
| style="text-align:left;"| 2015
| style="text-align:left;"| Phoenix
| 33 || 33 || 33.3 || .378 || .254 || .866 || 5.7 || 3.3 || 1.3 || 0.8 || 1.8 || 15.8
|-
| style="text-align:left;"| 2016
| style="text-align:left;"| Phoenix
| 34 || 24 || 31.3 || .424 || .329 || .798 || 5.4 || 2.4 || 1.2 || 0.6 || 1.6 || 14.5
|-
| style="text-align:left;"| 2018
| style="text-align:left;"| Phoenix
| 34 || 34 || 32.9 || .452 || .313 || .867 || 7.2 || 3.2 || 1.2 || 0.4 || 1.6 || 17.3
|-
| style="text-align:left;"| 2019
| style="text-align:left;"| Phoenix
| 34 || 34 || 32.9 || .377 || .272 || .916 || 7.6 || 2.7 || 1.3 || 0.6 || 1.6 || 17.6
|-
| style="text-align:left;"| 2020
| style="text-align:left;"| Connecticut
| 22 || 22 || 33.3 || .422 || .252 || .895 || 7.8 || 3.0 || 1.7 || 0.5 || 2.4 || 19.7
|-
| style="text-align:left;"| 2021
| style="text-align:left;"| Connecticut
| 32 || 32 || 31.9 || .395 || .317 || .892 || 6.4 || 3.5 || 1.3 || 0.7 || 2.2 || 15.2
|-
| style="text-align:left;"| 2022
| style="text-align:left;"| Connecticut
| 33 || 33 || 30.0 || .439 || .329 || .827 || 4.7 || 2.8 || 1.2 || 0.3 || 1.6 || 13.5
|-
| style="text-align:left;"| Career
| style="text-align:left;"| 13 years, 2 teams
| 422 || 320 || 30.3 || .415 || .301 || .859 || 6.2 || 2.3 || 1.2 || 0.7 || 1.6 || 14.7

Postseason

|-
| style="text-align:left;background:#afe6ba;"| 2009†
| style="text-align:left;"| Phoenix
| 11 || 0 || 16.9 || .493 || .000 || .829 || 4.3 || 0.3 || 0.4 || 0.5 || 0.6 || 8.8
|-
| style="text-align:left;"| 2010
| style="text-align:left;"| Phoenix
| 4 || 0 || 22.8 || .458 || .750 || .833 || 3.3 || 0.5 || 0.7 || 1.8 || 0.7 || 7.5
|-
| style="text-align:left;"| 2011
| style="text-align:left;"| Phoenix
| 5 || 5|| 35.8 || .348 || .217 || .857 || 9.4 || 1.2 || 1.4 || 1.2 || 1.6 || 12.6
|-
| style="text-align:left;"| 2013
| style="text-align:left;"| Phoenix
| 5 || 5 || 35.8 || .333|| .133 || .857 || 5.2 || 3.4 || 1.2 || 0.4 || 2.2 || 10.4
|-
| style="text-align:left;background:#afe6ba;"| 2014†
| style="text-align:left;"| Phoenix
| 8 || 8 || 35.8 || .360 || .333 || .905 || 6.0 || 2.0 || 1.3 || 0.6 || 1.7 || 11.3
|-
| style="text-align:left;"| 2015
| style="text-align:left;"| Phoenix
| 4 || 4 || 31.6 || .451 || .450 || .933 || 6.0 || 2.5 || 0.2 || 0.7 || 2.7 || 17.3
|-
| style="text-align:left;"| 2016
| style="text-align:left;"| Phoenix
| 5 || 0 || 24.2 || .426 || .000 || .824 || 4.2 || 1.6 || 1.0 || 0.0 || 2.8 || 10.8
|-
| style="text-align:left;"| 2018
| style="text-align:left;"| Phoenix
| 7 || 7 || style="background:#D3D3D3"|38.6° || .535 || .308 || .909 || 11.1 || 2.4 || 1.6 || 0.8 || 2.1 || 24.0
|-
| style="text-align:left;"| 2019
| style="text-align:left;"| Phoenix
| 1 || 1 || 33.0 || .357 || .667 || .900 || 6.0 || 2.0 || 1.0 || 0.0 || 2.0 || 21.0
|-
| style="text-align:left;"| 2020
| style="text-align:left;"| Connecticut
| 7 || 7 || 35.0 || .333 || .286 || 1.000 || 10.4 || 3.9 || 1.9 || 1.1 || 2.6 || 15.4
|-
| style="text-align:left;"| 2021
| style="text-align:left;"| Connecticut
| 4 || 4 || 35.0 || .404 || .400 || .909 || 7.0 || 1.3 || 1.0 || 1.8 || 2.8 || 13.5
|-
| style="text-align:left;"| 2022
| style="text-align:left;"| Connecticut
| 12 || 12 || 31.5 || .341 || .294 || .886 || 5.8 || 3.6 || 1.5 || 0.7 || 1.7 || 12.2
|-
| style="text-align:left;"| Career
| style="text-align:left;"| 12 years, 2 teams
| 73 || 53 || 30.6 || .403 || .290 || .893 || 6.6 || 2.1 || 1.2 || 0.8 || 1.8 || 13.0

International career

During the WNBA offseason, Bonner has played in the Czech Republic for BK Brno, Spain for Baloncesto Rivas and CB Avenida, and Russia for Nadezhda Orenburg.

References

1987 births
Living people
Basketball players from Alabama
Connecticut Sun players
American women's basketball players
Macedonian women's basketball players
American emigrants to North Macedonia
Naturalized citizens of North Macedonia
All-American college women's basketball players
American expatriate basketball people in China
American expatriate basketball people in the Czech Republic
American expatriate basketball people in Russia
American expatriate basketball people in Spain
Auburn Tigers women's basketball players
LGBT basketball players
LGBT people from Alabama
American LGBT sportspeople
Macedonian expatriate basketball people in Russia
Macedonian expatriate basketball people in Turkey
McDonald's High School All-Americans
Parade High School All-Americans (girls' basketball)
People from Fairfield, Alabama
Phoenix Mercury draft picks
Phoenix Mercury players
Shandong Six Stars players
Shooting guards
Small forwards
Women's National Basketball Association All-Stars
21st-century American LGBT people